The Minister of Interior of Hungary is a member of the Hungarian cabinet and the head of the Ministry of Interior. The current interior minister is Sándor Pintér.

The position was called People's Commissar of Interior during the Hungarian Soviet Republic in 1919 and Minister of Local Government between 2006 and 2010, when the ministry was divided into the Ministry of Local Government and the Ministry of Justice and Law.

This page is a list of Ministers of Interior of Hungary.

Ministers of Interior (1848–1919)

Hungarian Kingdom (1848–1849)
Parties

Hungarian State (1849)
Parties

After the collapse of the Hungarian Revolution of 1848, the Hungarian Kingdom became an integral part of the Austrian Empire until 1867, when dual Austro-Hungarian Monarchy was created.

Hungarian Kingdom (1867–1918)
Parties

Hungarian People's Republic (1918–1919)
Parties

People's Commissars of Interior (1919)

Hungarian Soviet Republic (1919)
Parties

Counter-revolutionary governments (1919)
Parties

Ministers of Interior (1919–2006)

Hungarian People's Republic (1919)
Parties

Hungarian Republic (1919–1920)
Parties

Hungarian Kingdom (1920–1946)
Parties

Government of National Unity (1944–1945)
Parties

Soviet-backed provisional governments (1944–1946)
Parties

Hungarian Republic (1946–1949)
Parties

Hungarian People's Republic (1949–1989)
Parties

Hungarian Republic (1989–2006)
Parties

Ministers of Local Government (2006–2010)

Hungarian Republic (2006–2010)
Parties

Ministers of Interior (2010–present)

Hungarian Republic / Hungary (2010–present)
Parties

See also
List of heads of state of Hungary
List of prime ministers of Hungary
List of Ministers of Agriculture of Hungary
List of Ministers of Civilian Intelligence Services of Hungary
List of Ministers of Croatian Affairs of Hungary
List of Ministers of Defence of Hungary
List of Ministers of Education of Hungary
List of Ministers of Finance of Hungary
List of Ministers of Foreign Affairs of Hungary
List of Ministers of Justice of Hungary
List of Ministers of Public Works and Transport of Hungary
Politics of Hungary

Interior Ministers